Tapiwa Lloyd Mafura (born ) is a Zimbabwean-born rugby union player for South African sides the  in the Pro14, the  in the Currie Cup and the  in the Rugby Challenge. His regular position is fullback or wing.

References

South African rugby union players
Zimbabwean rugby union players
Living people
1996 births
Sportspeople from Harare
Rugby union wings
Rugby union fullbacks
Free State Cheetahs players
Leopards (rugby union) players
Cheetahs (rugby union) players
Pumas (Currie Cup) players